The women's 200 metres event at the 2003 IAAF World Indoor Championships was held on March 14–15.

Medalists

Note: Michelle Collins of the USA originally won the gold medal but lost it due to a doping case.

Results

Heats
First 2 of each heat (Q) qualified directly for the semifinals.

Semifinals
First 2 of each semifinal (Q) qualified directly for the final.

Final

References
Results

2003 IAAF World Indoor Championships
200 metres at the IAAF World Indoor Championships
2003 in women's athletics